Rajbek Alvievich Bisultanov (born 29 May 1995 in Chechnya) is a Danish Greco-Roman wrestler of Chechen heritage. He won the gold medal in the 82 kg event at the 2019 European Wrestling Championships held in Bucharest, Romania.

Career 

In 2018, he won the gold medal in the men's 77 kg event at the European U23 Wrestling Championship held in Istanbul, Turkey.

In 2019, he competed in the 82 kg event at the World Wrestling Championships held in Nur-Sultan, Kazakhstan. He won his first match against Zoltán Lévai of Hungary and he was eliminated from the competition in his next match against Nurbek Khashimbekov of Uzbekistan. In 2021, he lost his bronze medal match in the 82 kg event at the European Wrestling Championships in Warsaw, Poland.

Personal life
Bisultanov is the older brother of Turpal Bisultanov.

Achievements

References

External links 
 

Living people
1995 births
Place of birth missing (living people)
Danish male sport wrestlers
European Wrestling Championships medalists
Russian emigrants to Denmark
Danish people of Chechen descent